Félix Adrien Bonfils (8 March 1831 – 1885) was a French photographer and writer who was active in the Middle East. He was one of the first commercial photographers to produce images of the Middle East on a large scale and amongst the first to employ a new method of colour photography, developed in 1880.

Life and career
Bonfils was born in Saint-Hippolyte-du-Fort and died in Alès. As a young man he worked as a bookbinder. In 1860, he joined General d'Hautpoul's expedition to the Levant, organised by France following the massacre of Christians in the civil conflict between Christians and Druze in Mount Lebanon and Damascus. On his return to France, it is thought that Bonfils was taught the heliogravure printing process by Abel Niépce de Saint-Victor and opened a printing office in Alès in 1864.  Soon after returning from Lebanon, he became a photographer.

In 1857, he married Marie-Lydie Cabanis. When his son, Adrien, fell ill, Bonfils remembered the green hills around Beirut and sent him there to recover, accompanied by his mother. The family moved to Beirut in 1867 where they opened a photographic studio called "Maison Bonfils".

Maison Bonfils produced thousands of photographs of the Middle East. Bonfils worked with both his wife and his son. Their studio became "F. Bonfils et Cie" in 1878. They photographed landscapes, portraits, posed scenes with subjects dressed up in Middle Eastern regalia, and also stories from the Bible. Bonfils took photographs in Lebanon, Egypt, Palestine, Syria, Greece and Constantinople (now Istanbul). While Bonfils produced the vast majority of his work, his wife, Lydie, and son Adrien were also involved in photography produced by the studio. As few are signed, it is difficult to identify who is responsible for individual photographs. Lydie is thought to have taken some of the studio portraits, especially those of Middle Eastern women, who were more inclined to pose for a female photographer. Adrien became more involved in the landscape photography at age 17, when Félix returned to Alès to have compiled collections of their photographs published and then to open a collotype printing factory. Félix died in Alès on the 9th of April 1855. 

Bonfils was amongst the first photographers to employ the new technique of Photochrom, a photographic colour printing technique, developed in 1880. Maison Bonfils was one of the most prolific studios in the Middle East in the late 19th-century. After Félix's death, the studio continued to produce photographs by the Bonfils family, first under Adrien's management, then Lydie's, until her death in 1918.

Work

After settling in the Near East, Bonfils took some panoramic photographs of Constantinople and Damascus. His work became well known among tourists that travelled to those countries because they bought photographs as souvenirs. In 1872 he published the album Architecture Antique (by Ducher press) after presenting some of his pictures to the Société française de photographie. He later re-opened a studio in Alès (France) from which he would publish Souvenirs d'Orient; his best-known work.

Select list of publications 
 Bonfils, F., Architecture antique : Égypte, Grèce, Asie Mineure, 1872
 Bonfils, F., Catalogue de vues photographiques de l'Orient, 1876
 Bonfils, F., Souvenirs d'Orient, 1878
 Bonfils, F. (with Adrien & Lydie Bonfils), Photographs of the Middle East, circa 1860s-1900s

L’Orient des Bonfils (1867-1918) 
On 11 May, 2017, the heirs of the Bonfils-Saalmüller family donated a number of archives with historical photographs by Félix, Marie-Lydie and Adrien Bonfils to the library of Egyptology at the Collège de France in Paris. These photographs and accompanying art historical text were published in 2022 as L’Orient des Bonfils (1867-1918). Les archives Bonfils de la bibliothèque d’égyptologie du Collège de France. In addition to the commercial print version of 865 pages with 461 black-and-white or colorized photographs, this book was also made available for free download as a contribution to Digital Humanities and for wide consultation on the Internet.

Selected photographs

Select list of institutions holding his work 

 Brooklyn Museum
 Collège de France, Library of Egyptology
 Fine Arts Museums of San Francisco
 Fred Jones Jr. Museum of Art, University of Oklahoma
 Harvard University Fine Arts Library
 J. Paul Getty Museum
 Minneapolis Institute of Arts
 Nelson-Atkins Museum of Art
Sursock Museum, with digital copies of this collection held in the Jafet Library of the American University of Beirut and the British Library Endangered Archives Programme.
 University of Michigan Museum of Art
 University of Tennessee, Knoxville
 Victoria and Albert Museum
 Virginia Museum of Fine Arts

See also
 History of Photography
 List of Orientalist artists
 Orientalism

References

External links

 
Photographs by Félix Bonfils at the Canadian Centre for Architecture
 Union List of Artists Names, s.v. "Bonfils, Félix", cited 6 February 2006
Images by Bonfils
The Bonfils Story: A Legacy Of Light
Collection of photos by Bonfils
Bonfils Felix - Photography on the Digital collections of Younes and Soraya Nazarian Library, University of Haifa
Presentation of Félix Bonfils and his work on the French National Library (BnF) site (in English)

Further reading
 Carney, G., The Image of the East: Nineteenth-Century Near-Eastern Photographs by Bonfils, [From the Collection of the Harvard Semitic Museum], Chicago/London. University of Chicago Press, 1982
  (free online version)

1831 births
1885 deaths
19th-century French photographers
Architectural photographers
Artists from Beirut
Photography in Lebanon
Photography in Turkey
Photography in the State of Palestine
Pioneers of photography
Early photographers in Palestine
People from Gard